The Haruhi Suzumiya series of Japanese light novels is written by Nagaru Tanigawa with accompanying illustrations drawn by Noizi Ito. The series centers on the eponymous high school girl Haruhi Suzumiya, her strange antics, and her friends in a club she forms called the SOS Brigade.

The first novel volume was published on June 6, 2003 by Kadokawa Shoten, and as of November 2020, 12 volumes have been published. The first pressing of the tenth and eleventh volumes was a record-breaking 513,000 copies.

Little, Brown Books for Young Readers licensed the light novels for distribution in English, with the first novel being released in May 2009, along with excerpts from the manga adaptation. The novels in English are available in hardback and paperback editions, the hardback featuring the original manga-style Japanese cover art and the paperback featuring a different design.

The novels have also been licensed for release in Taiwan, Hong Kong and Mainland China by Kadokawa Media, in South Korea by Daewon C.I., in Spain and Argentina by Editorial Ivrea, in Italy by Edizioni BD, in Thailand by Bongkoch Publishing, and in Vietnam by IPM. The tenth and the eleventh volumes were released consecutively in Japan, Mainland China, Taiwan, Hong Kong, and South Korea in an "unprecedented worldwide release" with the other licensed countries releasing later.


Volume list

References

External links
Kadokawa Shoten's website on the Haruhi Suzumiya series 

Haruhi Suzumiya
Haruhi Suzumiya
Multiple time paths in fiction